HDH could refer to:

 Dillingham Airfield, in Hawaii, United States
 Haa Dhaalu Atoll, an administrative division of the Maldives
 Hampstead Heath railway station, England
 Hawker de Havilland, an Australian aircraft manufacturer
 Hi-de-Hi!, a British sitcom
 Hipster Daddy-O and the Handgrenades, an American band
 Histidinol dehydrogenase
 Holland-Dozier-Holland, an American songwriting and production team
 Huelga De Hambre, a Peruvian band
 Herrera-Davis-Holland, one of the most dominant bullpen trios in baseball history.